This is a list of people who have served as Custos Rotulorum of Gloucestershire.

Sir Edmund Tame bef. 1544–1544
Sir Anthony Kingston 1544?–1556
Sir Nicholas Arnold bef. 1558–1580
Sir Thomas Throckmorton bef. 1584 – 1602 (deprived of office)
Sir John Poyntz 1602 – aft. 1608
Grey Brydges, 5th Baron Chandos bef. 1621–1621
Sir John Bridgeman 1621–1638
Thomas Coventry, 1st Baron Coventry 1638–1640
vacant?
Interregnum
George Berkeley, 1st Earl of Berkeley 1660–1689
Charles Berkeley, 2nd Earl of Berkeley 1689–1710
For later custodes rotulorum, see Lord Lieutenant of Gloucestershire.

References
Institute of Historical Research - Custodes Rotulorum 1544-1646
Institute of Historical Research - Custodes Rotulorum 1660-1828

History of Gloucestershire
Gloucestershire